Larry Lee Simms (October 1, 1934 –  June 17, 2009) was an American child actor who appeared in 36 films between 1937 and 1951.

Life and career 
Larry Simms was born October 1, 1934. He worked as a child model from the age of two and was discovered by a Hollywood talent scout when he appeared in a 1937 Saturday Evening Post advertisement. His first film was The Last Gangster (1937), where he played Edward G. Robinson's young son. Simms became known for his appearances as Alexander "Baby Dumpling" Bumstead in the popular Blondie film series starring Penny Singleton and Arthur Lake. Between 1938 and the end of the series in 1950, Simms appeared as Alexander in 28 films earning at one point $750 a week. In 1946, Simms joined the cast of the Blondie radio program, portraying Alexander there as he had in movies.

Simms occasionally acted outside of the Blondie series, most notably in two Frank Capra films. He played one of the sons of Governor Hopper (Guy Kibbee) in Mr. Smith Goes to Washington (1939) and Pete Bailey, the oldest son of James Stewart's George Bailey in It's a Wonderful Life (1946). He retired from show business to join the Navy (he appeared in uniform as himself in the Columbia Screen Snaphots short Hollywood Grows Up), then studied aeronautical engineering at California Polytech. He later worked at the Jet Propulsion Laboratory (JPL) in Pasadena, California and around the world as an engineer until his retirement from aeronautical engineering. Simms and his wife resided in Thailand prior to his death (on June 17 at age 74) in 2009.

Filmography 

 The Last Gangster (1937) - Joe Krozac Jr. as a Baby (uncredited)
 Blondie (1938) - Baby Dumpling
 Blondie Meets the Boss (1939) - Baby Dumpling
 Blondie Takes a Vacation (1939) - Baby Dumpling Bumstead
 Mr. Smith Goes to Washington (1939) - Hopper Boy #4
 Blondie Brings Up Baby (1939) - Alexander 'Baby Dumpling' Bumstead
 Blondie on a Budget (1940) - Baby Dumpling Bumstead
 Blondie Has Servant Trouble (1940) - Baby Dumpling
 Blondie Plays Cupid (1940) - Baby Dumpling
 Blondie Goes Latin (1941) - Baby Dumpling Bumstead
 Blondie in Society (1941) - Baby Dumpling
 Blondie Goes to College (1942) - Alexander 'Baby Dumpling' Bumstead
 Blondie's Blessed Event (1942) - Baby Dumpling (Alexander) Bumstead
 The Gay Sisters (1942) - Austin
 Blondie for Victory (1942) - Baby Dumpling
 It's a Great Life (1943) - Alexander Bumstead / Baby Dumpling
 Footlight Glamour (1943) - Alexander Bumstead
 Leave It to Blondie (1945) - Alexander Bumstead
 Life with Blondie (1945) - Alexander Bumstead
 Blondie's Lucky Day (1946) - Alexander Bumstead
 Blondie Knows Best (1946) - Alexander Bumstead
 It's a Wonderful Life (1946) - Pete Bailey
 Blondie's Big Moment (1947) - Alexander Bumstead
 Blondie's Holiday (1947) - Alexander Bumstead
 Golden Earrings (1947) - Horace - Pageboy (uncredited)
 Song of Love (1947) - Prince Albert (uncredited)
 Blondie in the Dough (1947) - Alexander Bumstead
 Blondie's Anniversary (1947) - Alexander Bumstead
 Blondie's Reward (1948) - Alexander Bumstead
 Blondie's Secret (1948) - Alexander Bumstead
 Blondie's Big Deal (1949) - Alexander Bumstead
 Madame Bovary (1949) - Justin
 Blondie Hits the Jackpot (1949) - Alexander Bumstead
 Blondie's Hero (1950) - Alexander Bumstead
 Beware of Blondie (1950) - Alexander Bumstead
 Her First Romance (1951) - Military Boy (uncredited) (final film role)
 Screen Snapshots Series 33, Hollywood Grows Up (1954, Documentary short) - Himself

References

Bibliography 
 John Holmstrom, The Moving Picture Boy: An International Encyclopaedia from 1895 to 1995, Norwich, Michael Russell, 1996, p. 190.

External links 
 
 

1934 births
2009 deaths
American male child actors
American male film actors
20th-century American male actors
Male actors from Los Angeles